Chrysanthia superba is a species of false blister beetles  belonging to the family Oedemeridae.

Distribution
These beetles are present in Spain, Portugal and North Africa.

Description
These beetles have a rather elongated bodies. Also the head is elongated, with strongly protruding eyes. Antennae are long and thread-like. Pronotum is elongated and heart-shaped. The front edge of the pronotum shows a deep groove. Elytra are densely punctured and have four longitudinal ribs. The legs and antennae are dark. Adults have  metallic green elytra and a metallic  orange pronotum.

References 

Oedemeridae
Beetles of Europe
Beetles described in 1872